Chervonaya Armiya is a rural locality (a selo) in Gorod Zavitinsk Urban Settlement of Zavitinsky District, Amur Oblast, Russia. The population was 190 as of 2018. There is 1 street.

Geography 
Chervonaya Armiya is located 9 km northeast of Zavitinsk (the district's administrative centre) by road. Zavitinsk is the nearest rural locality.

References 

Rural localities in Zavitinsky District